This is a list of investigational antipsychotics, or antipsychotics that are currently under development for clinical use but are not yet approved. Chemical/generic names are listed first, with developmental code names, synonyms, and brand names in parentheses.

Receptor modulators

Monoamine receptor modulators
 Brilaroxazine (RP-5063, RP-5000; oxaripiprazole) – atypical antipsychotic (D2 receptor partial agonist, 5-HT2A receptor antagonist, other actions)
 FKF-02SC (TGOF-02N) – atypical antipsychotic (D2 and 5-HT2A receptor antagonist, other actions)
 Masupirdine (SUVN-502) – 5-HT6 receptor antagonist
 N-methyl amisulpride (LB-102) – D2,3, 5-HT7, receptor antagonists (methylated version of amisulpride) 
 Ralmitaront (RG-7906, RO-6889450) – TAAR1 agonist
 Ulotaront (SEP-856, SEP-363856) – 5-HT1A receptor and TAAR1 agonist
 Usmarapride (SUVN-D4010) – 5-HT4 receptor partial agonist

Glutamate receptor modulators
 Pomaglumetad methionil (DB-103, LY-2140023, LY-2812223) – mGluR2 and mGluR3 agonist

Acetylcholine receptor modulators
 Emraclidine (CVL-231) –  M4 muscarinic acetylcholine receptor positive allosteric modulator.
KarXT (xanomeline/trospium) – combined M1 and M4 muscarinic acetylcholine receptor agonist and peripherally-selective muscarinic acetylcholine receptor antagonist.
ML-007 –  M1 and M4 muscarinic acetylcholine receptor agonist.
NBI-1117568 (HTL 0016878) –  M4 muscarinic acetylcholine receptor agonist.

Cannabinoid receptor modulators
 Cannabidiol (CBD; GW-42003, GWP-42003, GWP-42003-P, ECP-012A; Arvisol, Epidiolex) – cannabinoid receptor modulator, antioxidant, other actions

Other/mixed receptor modulators
 CVN766 – Orexin receptor type 1 antagonist
 Deudextromethorphan (d-DM; AVP-786, CTP-786) – σ1 receptor agonist, serotonin–norepinephrine reuptake inhibitor, uncompetitive NMDA receptor antagonist, muscarinic acetylcholine receptor agonist, other actions
 Roluperidone (CYR-101, MIN-101, MT-210) – 5-HT2A and σ2 receptor antagonist
 TAK-041 (NBI 1065846) – GPR139 receptor agonist

Enzyme inhibitors
 Luvadaxistat (NBI 1065844, TAK-831) – D-amino acid oxidase inhibitor.
 MK-8189 –  phosphodiesterase 10A inhibitor.
 Osoresnontrine (BI-409306, SUB-166499) – phosphodiesterase 9A inhibitor
 Sodium benzoate (SND-11, SND-12, SND-13, SND-14; Clozaben, NaBen) – D-amino acid oxidase inhibitor

Ion channel modulators
 Evenamide (NW-3509; NW-3509A) – Nav1.3, Nav1.7, and Nav1.8 voltage-gated sodium channel blocker

Others
 TS-134 (TS-1341) – undefined mechanism of action

See also
 List of investigational drugs

References

External links
 AdisInsight – Springer
 2016 Medicines in Development for Mental Health – PhRMA

Antipsychotics
Antipsychotics, investigational
Experimental drugs